Oil recovery refers to the cleaning and recovery methods after an oil spill:
Fast oil recovery
See also: Bottsand-class oil recovery ship, Skimmer, Oil Spill Eater II, Oil Spill Response Limited
or a form of tertiary (sometimes: improved secondary) recovery of crude oil from primary oil reserves:
Enhanced oil recovery
Microbial enhanced oil recovery
Solar thermal enhanced oil recovery
Alternatively it may simply be used as a euphemism for:
petroleum extraction and
oil drilling

Oil spill remediation technologies
Petroleum production